Gekko monarchus, also called the spotted house gecko,  is a species of gecko found in the Malay Peninsula (including southern Thailand and Singapore), some smaller Malaysian islands, Borneo (Brunei, East Malaysia and Kalimantan), the Philippines, many Indonesian islands including Sumatra, Java, Sulawesi, and New Guinea (Irian Jaya and Papua New Guinea).

Characteristics 

 This lizard has the typical body build of the genus Gekko - it appears flat and has a rough skin with small bumps on its back. 
 Their tails regenerate once dropped, as with most gecko species. The regenerated tail will never look the same as the original (it has a different texture and slightly odd color)
 Similar to common house geckos and dtellas, males make quiet clicking sounds when courting a female; both sexes are capable of chirping and "barking". When startled or alarmed, the gecko waves its tail quickly and may breathe heavily, making a sound not unlike hissing.
 They have a W spot on the backs of their heads, typical for this species.
 Monarch geckos are strictly insectivorous, feeding on various types of insects (roaches, crickets, flies, spiders, even wasps).

References

monarchus
Reptiles described in 1836
Geckos of Indonesia
Geckos of Malaysia
Reptiles of the Philippines
Geckos of Thailand
Reptiles of Borneo
Reptiles of Sulawesi
Fauna of Sumatra
Taxa named by Hermann Schlegel